Bert Chapman (born 14 March 1942) is a former Australian rules footballer who played for Collingwood in the Victorian Football League (VFL) during the 1960s.

Chapman was primarily a rover and in just six seasons managed eight finals appearances. This included the 1960 and 1964 VFL Grand Finals, where he was a reserve and wingman respectively. He left for Preston in 1967 and spent two years with the VFA club. Chapman then joined Macedon in the Riddell District Football League as coach for the 1969 season.

References

Holmesby, Russell and Main, Jim (2007). The Encyclopedia of AFL Footballers. 7th ed. Melbourne: Bas Publishing.

External links

1942 births
Living people
Collingwood Football Club players
Preston Football Club (VFA) players
Heidelberg Football Club players
Australian rules footballers from Victoria (Australia)